Brazil has participated in all the World Championships in Athletics since the beginning in 1983. Brazil is 53rd on the all time medal table. Brazil's first World Championships medal was a bronze medal won by Joaquim Cruz in the Men's 800 metres in 1983. Fabiana Murer won Brazil's first gold medal and the first woman's medal in the pole vault in 2011. Alison dos Santos was the first man to win a gold medal in the 400 metres hurdles in 2022. Claudinei Quirino has the most medals with three (one silver and two bronze).

Medalists

Source:

Medal tables

By championships

By event

By gender

Best Finishes

Men

Women

See also
 Brazil at the Olympics
 Brazil at the Pan American Games
 Brazil at the World Indoor Championships in Athletics

References

World Championships
World Championships in Athletics
Brazil